Saint-Marcellin is a soft French cheese made from cow's milk. Named after the small town of Saint-Marcellin (Isère), it is produced in a geographical area corresponding to part of the former Dauphiné province (now included in the Rhône-Alpes région). It is generally small in size, weighing about 80 grams (50% fat), with a mottled creamy-white exterior. The degree of runniness increases with age as the exterior gains blue, then yellow, hues within two to three weeks after production.

It is similar in texture and taste to Saint-Félicien, a larger cheese produced in a different part of the Rhône-Alpes région.

Saint-Marcellin is available in 3 degrees of ripening (affinage): sec, crémeux and bleu.

When Saint-Marcellin is cured in marc brandy for a month or more, it is called Arômes au Gène de Marc. If cured in white wine, it becomes Arômes de Lyon.

References

External links
 DOOR European Certification Database Entry

French cheeses
Cuisine of Auvergne-Rhône-Alpes
Cuisine of Lyon